Carlo Cracco (born 8 October 1965 in Creazzo, Veneto) is an Italian chef and television personality.

Biography 
Cracco attended the Pellegrino Artusi institute of hospitality management in Recoaro Terme. After graduating, he worked at the restaurant Da Remo in Vicenza. In 1986 he began to collaborate with fellow chef Gualtiero Marchesi in Milan. Later, he worked at the restaurant at La Meridiana, a resort in the province of Savona. Cracco then lived in France for three years, where he studied French culinary arts.

After that, Cracco returned to Italy, where he was chef at the Enoteca Pinchiorri in Florence. The restaurant was awarded two Michelin Stars. Soon Cracco was invited by Gualtiero Marchesi to collaborate once again, this time on the opening of his new restaurant L'Albereta in the region of Lombardy, where Cracco worked as chef for three years. He then opened a restaurant in the Piedmont region called Le Clivie, which earned a Michelin Star.

A few years later, Cracco accepted an invitation from the Stoppani family, owners of the Peck marketplace in Milan, to open a new restaurant called Cracco Peck. He continues to work there today as Executive Chef. Since 2007, the restaurant has been known simply as "Cracco."

The Italian food and wine magazine Gambero Rosso gave Cracco's restaurant "three forks" (their highest rating). In 2007, la Repubblica named it one of the 50 best restaurants in the world.

In February 2014, Cracco founded a bistro in Milan called Carlo e Camilla in segheria ("Carlo and Camilla in the sawmill"), which takes its name from the disused sawmill in which it resides.

In 2011, Cracco began hosting the show MasterChef Italia with Bruno Barbieri, Joe Bastianich and, since 2015, Antonino Cannavacciuolo. Cracco has served as president of the nonprofit organization Maestro Martino since 2012. On 13 February 2013 he appeared at the Sanremo Music Festival, to introduce the artist Annalisa. Cracco was a host on the first and second seasons of Hell's Kitchen Italia on the channel Sky Uno.

He received the America Award of the Italy–USA Foundation in 2019.

Family 
Cracco has two daughters from his first marriage, Sveva and Irene. He is currently married to Rosa Fanti, with whom he has two sons, Pietro and Cesare.

Filmography

television

 MasterChef Italia, Cielo (2011); Sky Uno (2011–2016)
 Hell's Kitchen Italia (2014–)
The Final Table (2018, episode: "Italy")

References

External links 
 
 

1965 births
Italian chefs
Italian television personalities
Living people
Place of birth missing (living people)
Italian restaurateurs
Italian television chefs
Head chefs of Michelin starred restaurants
Italian cuisine
Italian cookbook writers
Chefs of Italian cuisine
Italian chief executives
Italian food writers